The Gallaeci (also Callaeci or Callaici) were a Celtic tribal complex who inhabited Gallaecia, the north-western corner of Iberia, a region roughly corresponding to what is now the Norte Region in northern Portugal, and the Spanish regions of Galicia, western Asturias and western León before and during the Roman period. They spoke a Q-Celtic language related to Northeastern Hispano-Celtic, called Gallaecian or Northwestern Hispano-Celtic. The region was annexed by the Romans in the time of Caesar Augustus during the Cantabrian Wars, a war which initiated the assimilation of the Gallaeci into Latin culture.

The endonym of modern-day Galicians, galegos, derives directly from the name of this people.

Archaeology
Archaeologically, the Gallaeci evolved from the local Atlantic Bronze Age culture (1300–700 BC). During the Iron Age they received additional influences, including from Southern Iberian and Celtiberian cultures, and from central-western Europe (Hallstatt and, to a lesser extent, La Tène culture), and from the Mediterranean (Phoenicians and Carthaginians). The Gallaeci dwelt in hill forts (locally called castros), and the archaeological culture they developed is known by archaeologists as "Castro culture", a hill-fort culture (usually, but not always) with round or elongated houses.

The Gallaecian way of life was based in land occupation especially by fortified settlements that are known in Latin language as "castra" (hillforts) or "oppida" (citadels); they varied in size from small villages of less than one hectare (more common in the northern territory) to great walled citadels with more than 10 hectares sometimes denominated oppida, being these latter more common in the Southern half of their traditional settlement and around the Ave river. 

Due to the dispersed nature of their settlements, large towns were rare in pre-Roman Gallaecia although some medium-sized oppida have been identified, namely the obscure Portus Calle (also known as Cales or Cale; Castelo de Gaia, near Porto), Avobriga (Castro de Alvarelhos – Santo Tirso?), Tongobriga (Freixo – Marco de Canaveses), Brigantia (Bragança?), Tyde/Tude (Tui), Lugus (Lugo) and the Atlantic trading port of Brigantium (also designated Carunium; Betanzos – La Coruña). 

This livelihood in hillforts was common throughout Europe during the Bronze and Iron Ages, getting in the northwest of the Iberian Peninsula, the name of 'Castro culture" (Castrum culture) or "hillfort's culture", which alludes to this type of settlement prior to the Roman conquest. However, several Gallaecian hillforts continued to be inhabited until the 5th century AD.

These fortified villages or cities tended to be located in the hills, and occasionally rocky promontories and peninsulas near the seashore, as it improved visibility and control over territory. These settlements were strategically located for a better control of natural resources, including mineral ores such as iron. The Gallaecian hillforts and oppidas maintained a great homogeneity and presented clear commonalities. The citadels, however, functioned as city-states and could have specific cultural traits.

The names of such hill-forts, as preserved in Latin inscriptions and other literary sources, were frequently composite nouns with a second element such as -bris (from proto-Celtic *brixs), -briga (from proto-Celtic *brigā), -ocelum (from proto-Celtic *okelo-), -dunum (from proto-Celtic *dūno-) all meaning "hill > hill-fort" or similar: Aviliobris, Letiobri, Talabriga, Nemetobriga, Louciocelo, Tarbucelo, Caladunum, etc. Others are superlative formations (from proto-Celtic *-isamo-, -(s)amo-): Berisamo (from *Bergisamo-), Sesmaca (from *Segisamo-). Many Galician modern day toponyms derive from these old settlements' names: Canzobre < Caranzovre < *Carantiobrixs, Trove < Talobre < *Talobrixs, Ombre < Anobre < *Anobrixs, Biobra < *Vidobriga, Bendollo < *Vindocelo, Andamollo < *Andamocelo, Osmo < Osamo < *Uxsamo, Sésamo < *Segisamo, Ledesma < *φletisama...

Associated archaelogically with the hill forts are the famous Gallaecian warrior statues - slighlty larger than life size statues of warriors, assumed to be deified local heroes.

Political-territorial organization
The Gallaecian political organization is not known with certainty but it is very probable that they were divided into small independent chiefdoms who the Romans called populus or civitas, each one ruled by a local petty king or chief (princeps), as in other parts of Europe. Each populus comprised a sizeable number of small hillforts (castellum). So each Gallaecian considered themselves a member of his or her populus and of the hillfort where they lived, as deduced by their usual onomastic phormula: first Name + patronymic (genitive) + (optionally) populus or nation (nominative) + (optionally) origin of the person = name of their hill-fort (ablative):

 Nicer Clvtosi > Cavriaca principis Albionum: Nicer son of Clutosius, from (the hill-fort known as) Cauria, prince of the Albions.
 Apana Ambolli f Celtica Supertam(arica)> [---]obri: Apana daughter of Ambollus, a Supertamaric Celtic, from (the hill-fort known as) [-]obri.
 Anceitvs Vacci f Limicvs > Talabric(a): Ancetos son of Vaccios, a Limic, from (the hill-fort known as) Talabriga.
 Bassvs Medami f Grovvs > Verio: Bassos son of Medamos, a Grovian, from (the hill-fort known as) Verio.
 Ladronu[s] Dovai Bra[ca]rus Castell[o] Durbede: Ladronos son of Dovaios, a Bracaran, from the castle Durbeds.

Gallaeci tribes
us

Bracarenses
 Abobrigenses
 Aquaflavienses / Aquiflavienses 
 Bracari
 Bibali
 Caladuni
 Coelerni
 Equaesi
 Gallaeci Proper / Callaeci Proper
 Grovii / Grovi
 Helleni
 Interamici / Interamnici
 Leuni
 Luanqui
 Lubaeni
 Limici
 Narbasi
 Nemetati
 Quaquerni / Quarquerni / Querquerni
 Seurbi
 Tamagani
 Turodi / Turodes

Lucenses
 Adovi / Iadovi
 Albiones
 Arroni
 Arrotrebae / Artabri
 Baedi
 Capori / Copori
 Celtici Praestamarici
 Celtici Supertamarici
 Cibarci / Cabarci
 Cileni / Celeni
 Egi / Egovarri / Varri Namarini
 Lemavi
 Nerii / Neri
 Seurri

Other minor groups
 Aebocosi
 Amphilochi
 Artodii
 Aunonenses
 Banienses
 Barhantes
 Brassii
 Brigantes (Gallaecian tribe)
 Cuci
 Iadones
 Lapatianci
 Louguei
 Naebisoci / Aebisoci
 Namarii
 Poemani
 Segodii
 Tongobrigenses

Pomponius Mela, who described the Galician seashore and their dwellers around 40 AD, divided the coastal Gallaeci in non-Celtic Grovii along the southern areas; the Celtic peoples who lived along the Rías Baixas and Costa da Morte regions in northern Galicia; and the also Celtic Artabri who dwelled all along the northern coast in between the latter and the Astures.

Origin of the name
The Romans named the entire region north of the Douro, where the Castro culture existed, in honour of the castro people that settled in the area of Calle — the Callaeci. The Romans established a port in the south of the region which they called Portus Calle, today's Porto, in northern Portugal. When the Romans first conquered the Callaeci they ruled them as part of the province of Lusitania but later created a new province of Callaecia or Gallaecia.

The names "Callaici" and "Calle" are the origin of today's Gaia, Galicia, and the "Gal" root in "Portugal", among many other placenames in the region.

Gallaecian language
Gallaecian was a Q-Celtic language or group of languages or dialects, closely related to Celtiberian, spoken at the beginning of our era in the north-western quarter of the Iberian Peninsula, more specifically between the west and north Atlantic coasts and an imaginary line running north–south and linking Oviedo and Mérida. Just like it is the case for Illyrian or Ligurian languages, its corpus is composed by isolated words and short sentences contained in local Latin inscriptions, or glossed by classic authors, together with a considerable number of names – anthroponyms, ethnonyms, theonyms, toponyms – contained in inscriptions, or surviving up to date as place, river or mountain names. Besides, many of the isolated words of Celtic origin preserved in the local Romance languages could have been inherited from these Q-Celtic dialects.

Gallaecian deities

Through the Gallaecian-Roman inscriptions, is known part of the great pantheon of Gallaecian deities, sharing part not only by other Celtic or Celticized peoples in the Iberian Peninsula, such as Astur — especially the more Western — or Lusitanian, but also by Gauls and Britons among others. This will highlight the following:
 Bandua: Gallaecian God of War, similar to the Roman god, Mars. Great success among the Gallaeci of Braga.
 Berobreus: god of the Otherworld and beyond. The largest shrine dedicated to Berobreo documented until now, stood in the fort of the Torch of Donón (Cangas), in the Morrazo's Peninsula, front of the Cíes Islands.
 Bormanicus: god of hot springs similar to the Gaulish god, Bormanus.
 Nabia: goddess of waters, of fountains and rivers. In Galicia and Portugal still nowadays, numerous rivers that still persist with his name, as the river Navia, ships and in northern Portugal there is the Idol Fountain, dedicated to the goddess ship.
 Cossus, warrior god, who attained great popularity among the Southern Gallaeci, was one of the most revered gods in ancient Gallaecia. Several authors suggest that Cosso and Bandua are the same God under different names.
 Reue, associated with the supreme God hierarchy, justice and also death.
 Lugus, or Lucubo, linked to prosperity, trade and craft occupations. His figure is associated with the spear. It is one of gods most common among the Celts and many, many place names derived from it throughout Europe Celtic Galicia (Galicia Lucus Latinized form) to Loudoun (Scotland), and even the naming of people as Gallaecia Louguei .
 Coventina, goddess of abundance and fertility. Strongly associated with the water nymphs, their cult record for most Western Europe, from England to Gallaecia.
 Endovelicus (Belenus), god of prophecy and healing, showing the faithful in dreams.

History

The fact that the Gallaeci did not adopt writing until contact with the Romans constrains the study of their earlier history. However, early allusions to this people are present in ancient Greek and Latin authors prior to the conquest, which allows the reconstruction of a few historical events of this people since the second century BC. The oldest known inscription referring to the Gallaeci (reading Ἔθνο[υς] Καλλαϊκῶ[ν], "people of the Gallaeci") was found in 1981 in the Sebasteion of Aphrodisias, Turkey, where a triumphal monument to Augustus mentions them among other fifteen nations allegedly conquered by this Roman emperor.

Protected by their mountainous country, the Gallaican tribes did not fell under Carthaginian rule at the later 3rd century BC, though a combined Gallaeci-Lusitani mercenary contingent led by a chieftain named Viriathus (not to be confused with the later Lusitani general bearing the same name that battled the Romans in Spain in the mid-2nd century BC) is mentioned in Hannibal's army during his march to Italy during the Second Punic War, participating in the battles of Lake Trasimene and Cannae.  

On his epic poem Punica, Silius Italicus gives a short description of these mercenaries and their military tactics:

The Gallaeci came to direct contact with Rome relatively late, in the wake of the Roman punitive campaigns against their southern neighbours, the Lusitani and the Turduli Veteres. Regarded as hardy fighters, Gallaeci warriors fought for the Lusitani during Viriathus' campaigns in the south, and in 138-136 BC they faced the very first Roman incursion into their territory by consul Decimus Junius Brutus, whose campaign reached as far as the river Nimis (possibly the Minho or Miño). After seizing the town of Talabriga (Marnel, Lamas do Vouga – Águeda) from the Turduli Veteres, he crushed an allegedly 60,000-strong Gallaeci relief army sent to support the Lusitani at a desperate and difficult battle near the Durius river, in which 50,000 Gallaicans were slain, 6,000 were taken prisoner and only a few managed to escape, before withdrawing south. 

It remains unclear if the Gallaeci participated actively in the Sertorian Wars, although a fragment of Sallust records the sertorian legate Marcus Perperna Veiento capturing the town of Cale in around 74 BC. Later in 61-60 BC the propraetor of Hispania Ulterior Julius Caesar forced upon them the recognition of Roman suzerainty after defeating the northern Gallaeci in a combined sea-and-land battle at Brigantium (also designated Carunium; Betanzos – La Coruña), but it remained mostly nominal until the outbreak of the first Astur-Cantabrian War in 29 BC. Paulus Orosius briefly mentions that the Augustan legates Gaius Antistius Vetus and Gaius Firmius fought a difficult campaign to subdue the Gallaeci tribes of the more remote forested and mountainous parts of Gallaecia bordering the Atlantic Ocean, defeating them only after a series of severe battles, though no exact details are given. After conquering Gallaecia, Augustus promptly used its territory – now part of his envisaged Transduriana Province, whose organization was entrusted to consul Lucius Sestius Quirinalis Albinianus – as a springboard to his rear offensive against the Astures.

Romanization
In the later part of the 1st century BC military colonies were established and the pacified Gallaeci tribes were re-organized by Augustus into the new province of Gallaecia (Greek: Kallaikia), with the colony of Bracara Augusta (Braga) as its provincial capital.  Gallaecia during the Empire became a recruiting district of auxiliary troops (auxilia) for the Roman Army and Gallaican auxiliary cavalry (equitatae) and infantry (peditatae) units (Cohors II Lucensium, Cohors III Lucensium, Cohors I Bracaraugustanorum, Cohors III Bracaraugustanorum, Cohors III Callaecorum Bracaraugustanorum, Cohors V Callaecorum Lucensium, Cohors VI Braecarorum, Cohors I Asturum et Callaecorum) distinguished themselves during Emperor Claudius' conquest of Britain in AD 43-60.  The region remained one of the last redoubts of Celtic culture and language in the Iberian Peninsula well into the Roman imperial period, at least until the spread of Christianity and the Germanic invasions of the late 4th/early 5th centuries AD, when it was conquered by the Suevi and their Hasdingi Vandals' allies.

See also
 Albiones
 Astures
 Cantabri
 Celtici
 Gallaecia
 Gallaecian language
 Gallaecian warrior statues
 Galician Institute for Celtic Studies
 Prehistoric Iberia
 Pre-Roman peoples of the Iberian Peninsula

Notes

References

 Ángel Montenegro et alii, Historia de España 2 - colonizaciones y formación de los pueblos prerromanos (1200-218 a.C), Editorial Gredos, Madrid (1989) 
 André Pena Granha, "A CULTURA CASTREXA INEXISTENTE. CONSTITUIÇÃO POLÍTICA DAS GALAICAS TREBA". Cátedra, Pontedeume (2014)
 Armando Coelho Ferreira da Silva, A Cultura Castreja no Noroeste de Portugal, Museu Arqueológico da Citãnia de Sanfins, Paços de Ferreira (1986)
 Francisco Manuel Veleda Reimão Queiroga, War and castros: new approaches to the north-western Portuguese Iron Age, BAR International Series, Archaeopress, Oxford (2003) 
 José Manuel Coutinhas, Aproximação à identidade etno-cultural dos Callaici Bracari, Porto (2006)

Further reading

 Daniel Varga, The Roman Wars in Spain: The Military Confrontation with Guerrilla Warfare, Pen & Sword Military, Barnsley (2015) 
 Mário Varela Gomes & Armando Coelho Ferreira da Silva, Proto-História de Portugal, Universidade Aberta, Lisboa (1995) 
 Martín Almagro-Gorbea, José María Blázquez Martínez, Michel Reddé, Joaquín González Echegaray, José Luis Ramírez Sádaba, and Eduardo José Peralta Labrador (coord.), Las Guerras Cántabras, Fundación Marcelino Botín, Santander (1999) 
 Leonard A.Curchin, Roman Spain – Conquest and assimilation, Routledge, an imprint of Taylor & Francis Books Ltd, London (1991) 
 Luis Berrocal-Rangel, Los pueblos célticos del soroeste de la Península Ibérica, Editorial Complutense, Madrid (1992) 
 Luis Silva, Viriathus and the Lusitanian resistance to Rome 155-139 BC, Pen & Sword Military, Barnsley (2013) 
 Philip Matyszak, Sertorius and the struggle for Spain, Pen & Sword Military, Barnsley (2013) 
 R. F. J. Jones, The Roman Military Occupation of North-West Spain, The Journal of Roman Studies (JRS), Vol. 66, Society for the Promotion of Roman Studies (1976), pp. 45-66. –

External links
 Detailed map of the Pre-Roman Peoples of Iberia (around 200 BC)
 http://www.celtiberia.net

Tribes of Gallaecia
History of Galicia (Spain)
History of Asturias
Ancient peoples of Spain
Ancient peoples of Portugal